Lanena is a locality and small rural community in the local government area of West Tamar, in the Western Tamar Valley region of Tasmania. The Tamar River forms the north-eastern and eastern boundaries. The 2016 census determined a population of 320 for the state suburb of Lanena.

History
Originally known as “Blackwell”, the locality name is derived from an Aboriginal word meaning “day”.

Road infrastructure
The C733 route (Rosevears Drive) intersects with the West Tamar Highway, which passes through the locality from south-east to north-west. It runs south-east through the locality to Rosevears.

References

Localities of West Tamar Council
Towns in Tasmania